In textual criticism of the New Testament, the Western text-type is one of the main text types. It is the predominant form of the New Testament text witnessed in the Old Latin and Syriac Peshitta translations from the Greek, and also in quotations from certain 2nd and 3rd-century Christian writers, including Cyprian, Tertullian and Irenaeus. The Western text had many characteristic features, which appeared in text of the Gospels, Book of Acts, and in Pauline epistles. The Catholic epistles and the Book of Revelation probably did not have a Western form of text. It was named "Western" by Semmler (1725–1791), having originated in early centers of Christianity in the Western Roman Empire.

Description 
The main characteristic of the Western text is a love of paraphrase: "Words and even clauses are changed, omitted, and inserted with surprising freedom, wherever it seemed that the meaning could be brought out with greater force and definiteness." One possible source of glossing is the desire to harmonise and to complete: "More peculiar to the Western text is the readiness to adopt alterations or additions from sources extraneous to the books which ultimately became canonical." This text type often presents longer variants of text, but in a few places, including the end of the Gospel of Luke, it has shorter variants, named Western non-interpolations.

Only one Greek Uncial manuscript is considered to transmit a Western text for the four Gospels and the Book of Acts, the fifth century Codex Bezae; the sixth century Codex Claromontanus is considered to transmit a Western text for the letters of Saint Paul and is followed by two ninth century Uncials: F and G. Many "Western" readings are also found in the Old Syriac translations of the Gospels, the Sinaitic and the Curetonian, though opinions vary as to whether these versions can be considered witnesses to the Western text-type. A number of fragmentary early papyri from Egypt also have Western readings, 𝔓29, 𝔓38, 𝔓48; and in addition, Codex Sinaiticus is considered to be Western in the first eight chapters of John. The term "Western" is a bit of a misnomer because members of the Western text-type have been found in the Christian East, including Syria.

Witnesses 

Other manuscripts: 𝔓25, 𝔓29 (?), 𝔓41, 066, 0177, 36, 88, 181 (Pauline epistles), 255, 257, 338, 383 (Acts), 440 (Acts), 614 (Acts), 913, 915, 917, 1108, 1245, 1518, 1611, 1836, 1874, 1898, 1912, 2138, 2298, 2412 (Acts).

Compared to the Byzantine text-type distinctive Western readings in the Gospels are more likely to be abrupt in their Greek expression. Compared to the Alexandrian text-type distinctive Western readings in the Gospels are more likely to display glosses, additional details, and instances where the original passages appear to be replaced with longer paraphrases. In distinction from both Alexandrian and Byzantine texts, the Western text-type consistently omits a series of eight short phrases from verses in the Gospel of Luke; the so-called Western non-interpolations. In at least two Western texts, the Gospels appear in a variant order: Matthew, John, Luke, Mark. The Western text of the Epistles of Paul - as witnessed in the Codex Claromontanus and uncials F and G - does not share the periphrastic tendencies of the Western text in the Gospels and Acts, and it is not clear whether they should be considered to share a single text-type.

Although the Western text-type survives in relatively few witnesses, some of these are as early as the earliest witnesses to the Alexandrian text type.  Nevertheless, the majority of text critics consider the Western text in the Gospels to be characterised by periphrasis and expansion; and accordingly tend to prefer the Alexandrian readings.  In the letters of St Paul, the counterpart Western text is more restrained, and some text critics regard it as the most reliable witness to the original. Nonetheless, the 'Western' Pauline materials do exhibit distinctive redactional biases, with a number of distinctive variants which collectively tend to diminish the status of the women in the congregations addressed by Paul.

Textual variants 

Mark 13:2
  — D W it

Mark 13:33 
 omitted phrase  ('and pray') by codices B, D, a, c, k

Mark 15:34 (see Ps 22:2) 
  ('insult me') — D, itc, (i), k, syrh
  ('forsaken me') — Alexandrian mss
  (see Mt 27:46) — Byzantine mss

John 1:4
  ('in him is life') — Codex Sinaiticus, Codex Bezae and majority of Vetus Latina manuscripts and Sahidic manuscripts. 
  ('in him was life') — this variant is supported by mss of the Alexandrian, Byzantine and Caesarean texts 
John 1:30: 
  — p5, p66, p75, Sinaiticus*, Codex Vaticanus Graecus 1209, C*, WS 
  — Sinaiticus2, A, C3, L, Θ, Ψ, 063, 0101, f1, f13, Byz 
John 1:34
  — p5, Sinaiticus, itb,e,ff2, syrc,s 
  — ita, ff2c, syrpalmss, copsa 
  — mss of the Alexandrian, Byzantine and Caesarean texts 
John 3:15
  — p75, B, WS, 083, 0113 
  — p63, A 
  — p63, Sinaiticus, A, Koridethi, Athous Lavrensis, 063, 086, f1, f13, Byz
John 7:8
  — Sinaiticus, Bezae, Cyprius, Petropolitanus, 1071, 1079, 1241, 1242, 1546 
  — Papyrus 66, Papyrus 75, Vaticanus, Regius, Borgianus, Washingtonianus, Monacensis, Sangallensis, Koridethi, Athous Lavrensis, Uncial 0105, 0180, 0250, f1, f13, 28, 700, 892, 1010, 1195, 1216, 1230, 1253, 1344, 1365, 1646, 2148, mss of Byz.

Romans 12:11

1 Corinthians 7:5
  ('prayer') – 𝔓11, 𝔓46, א*, A, B, C, D, F, G, P, Ψ, 6, 33, 81, 104, 181, 629, 630, 1739, 1877, 1881, 1962, it vg, cop, arm, eth
  ('fasting and prayer') – אc, K, L, 88, 326, 436, 614, 1241, 1984, 1985, 2127, 2492, 2495, Byz, Lect, syrp,h, goth
  ('prayer and fasting') – 330, 451, John of Damascus

1 Corinthians 14:34-35
 both verses are displaced to the conclusion of Chapter 14, following verse 40 – Codex Claromontanus, Codex Augiensis, Codex Boernerianus.

See also 
 Acts of the Apostles#Manuscripts
 Caesarean text-type 
 Categories of New Testament manuscripts 
 Western non-interpolations

Notes

Bibliography 

 J. Rendel Harris, Four lectures on the western text of the New Testament (London 1894)
 A. F. J. Klijn, A Survey of the Researches Into the Western Text of the Gospels and Acts (1949-1959), Novum Testamentum, Volume 3, Numbers 1–2, 1959, pp. 1–53. 
 Bruce M. Metzger, Bart D. Ehrman, The Text of the New Testament: Its Transmission, Corruption, and Restoration, Oxford University Press, New York, Oxford 2005, pp. 276–277. 
 Bruce M. Metzger, A Textual Commentary On The Greek New Testament: A Companion Volume To The United Bible Societies' Greek New Testament, 1994, United Bible Societies, London & New York, pp. 5*-6*. 
 Delobel J., Focus on the ‘Western’ Text in Recent Studies, Ephemerides Theologicae Lovanienses, 1997, vol.73, pp. 401–410.

External links 
 Western text at the Encyclopedia of Textual Criticism 
 The Western Text of the Acts of the Apostles (1923) 
 The Western Non-Interpolations 
 Hort's Theory of 'Western Non-Interpolations

New Testament text-types
Biblical criticism